Command Prompt, also known as cmd.exe or cmd, is the default command-line interpreter for the OS/2, eComStation, ArcaOS, Microsoft Windows (Windows NT family and Windows CE family), and ReactOS operating systems. On Windows CE .NET 4.2, Windows CE 5.0 and Windows Embedded CE 6.0 it is referred to as the Command Processor Shell.

Operation
 interacts with the user through a command-line interface. On Windows, this interface is implemented through the Win32 console.  may take advantage of features available to native programs of its own platform. For example, on OS/2 and Windows, it can use real pipes in command pipelines, allowing both sides of the pipeline to run concurrently. As a result, it is possible to redirect the standard error stream. ( uses temporary files, and runs the two sides serially, one after the other.)

Multiple commands can be processed in a single command line using the command separator .  

When using this separator in the Windows , each command must complete successfully for the following commands to execute. For example:
C:\>CommandA && CommandB && CommandC

To process subsequent commands even if the previous command produces an error, the command separator  should be used. For example:C:\>CommandA & CommandB & CommandC

On Windows XP or later, the maximum length of the string that can be used at the command prompt is 8191 characters. On earlier versions, such as Windows 2000 or Windows NT 4.0, the maximum length of the string is 2047 characters. This limit includes the command line, individual environment variables that are inherited by other processes, and all environment variable expansions.

Quotation marks are required for the following special characters:
 & < > [ ] { } ^ = ; ! ' + , ` ~ [white space]

Internal commands

OS/2

The following is a list of the Microsoft OS/2 internal  commands:

 break
 chcp
 cd
 chdir
 cls
 copy
 date
 del
 detach
 dir
 dpath
 echo
 erase
 exit
 for
 goto
 if
 md
 mkdir
 path
 pause
 prompt
 rd
 rem
 ren
 rename
 rmdir
 set
 shift
 start
 time
 type
 ver
 verify
 vol

Windows NT family

 assoc
 break
 call
 cd
 chdir
 cls
 color
 copy
 date
 del
 dir
 dpath
 echo
 endlocal
 erase
 exit
 for
 ftype
 goto
 if
 keys
 md
 mkdir
 mklink (introduced in Windows Vista)
 move
 path
 pause
 popd
 prompt
 pushd
 rd
 rem
 ren
 rename
 rmdir
 set
 setlocal
 shift
 start
 time
 title
 type
 ver
 verify
 vol

Windows CE

 attrib
 call
 cd
 chdir
 cls
 copy
 date
 del
 dir
 echo
 erase
 exit
 goto
 help
 if
 md
 mkdir
 move
 path
 pause
 prompt
 pwd
 rd
 rem
 ren
 rename
 rmdir
 set
 shift
 start
 time
 title
 type

ReactOS

The ReactOS implementation includes the following internal commands:

 ?
 alias
 assoc
 beep
 call
 cd
 chdir
 choice
 cls
 color
 copy
 ctty
 date
 del
 delete
 delay
 dir
 dirs
 echo
 echos
 echoerr
 echoserr
 endlocal
 erase
 exit
 for
 free
 goto
 history
 if
 memory
 md
 mkdir
 mklink
 move
 path
 pause
 popd
 prompt
 pushd
 rd
 rmdir
 rem
 ren
 rename
 replace
 screen
 set
 setlocal
 shift
 start
 time
 timer
 title
 type
 ver
 verify
 vol

Comparison with COMMAND.COM
On Windows,  is mostly compatible with  but provides the following extensions over it:

In OS/2, errors are reported in the chosen language of the system, their text being taken from the system message files. The  command can then be issued with the error message number to obtain further information.
 Supports using of arrow keys to scroll through command history. (Under DOS this function was only available under DR DOS (through HISTORY) and later via an external component called .)
 Treats the caret character as the escape character; the character following it is to be taken literally. "", "" and "|") that are meant to alter the behavior of the command line processor. The caret character forces the command line processor to interpret them literally.
The extensions can be disabled, providing a stricter compatibility mode.

Internal commands have also been improved:

 The  command was merged into the  command, as part of its  switch.
  and  commands limit the scope of changes to the environment. Changes made to the command line environment after  commands are local to the batch file.  command restores the previous settings.
 The  command allows subroutines within batch file. The  command in  only supports calling external batch files.
 File name parser extensions to the  command are comparable with C shell.
 The  command can perform expression evaluation.
 An expansion of the  command supports parsing files and arbitrary sets in addition to file names.
 The new  and  commands provide access past navigated paths similar to "forward" and "back" buttons in a web browser or File Explorer.
 The conditional  command can perform case-insensitive comparisons and numeric equality and inequality comparisons in addition to case-sensitive string comparisons. (This was available in DR-DOS, but not in PC DOS or MS-DOS.)

See also
 Comparison of command shells
 List of DOS commands
 COMMAND.COM
 PowerShell
 Windows Terminal

References

Further reading

External links

 
 
 
 
 

Command shells
OS/2 command shells
Windows command shells
OS/2 commands
OS/2 files
Windows commands
Windows files
Windows components